Küçükköy is a neighbourhood of the town Borçka, Borçka District, Artvin Province, Turkey. As of 2021, it had a population of 784 people.

History 
According to Ottoman sources, name of the neighbourhood is Dakvara or Takvara. Most inhabitants of the neighbourhood are ethnically Laz.

References

Borçka District
Laz settlements in Turkey